Kentilla is a text adventure game written in Basic by British developer Derek Brewster and published by Micromega. It was later rereleased as a budget title by Mastertronic.

Game music composer Rob Hubbard created the score for the Commodore 64 version, while the ZX Spectrum and Amstrad CPC versions were mute.

Reception
Crash were impressed by the Spectrum version of the game, stating "Kentilla is a sure winner as an adventure with many devious problems which should keep any adventurer busy through the coming winter months and it’s excellent value for money."  It was given a 10/10 Overall rating.

Zzap!64 enjoyed the Commodore 64 version which was given a 90% overall rating.

References

External links 
 
 

1980s interactive fiction
1984 video games
Amstrad CPC games
ZX Spectrum games
Commodore 64 games
Mastertronic games
Video games scored by Rob Hubbard
Video games developed in the United Kingdom